Lisa Fithian is an American political activist and protest consultant.

Early life
Lisa Fithian, American political activist and protest consultant, began her work in the mid-1970s as a member of student government in her high school and at Skidmore College.

Activism

As a member and coordinator of the Washington Peace Center for seven years during the 1980s, Fithian organized hundreds of events and demonstrations on a range of issues, locally and nationally, and helped lead an extensive anti-racism process that transformed the Peace Center into a multicultural organization.

In the early 1990s, Fithian joined the labor movement, bringing her experience to the Justice for Janitors campaigns in Washington, D.C., Denver, and Los Angeles, and to nursing-home workers in San Francisco and Detroit. She also provided training and support work to the United Auto Workers and with the Detroit Newspaper Strikers.

Fithian has continued her work for social, economic, and environmental justice, providing training and organizing support to many of the global-justice mobilizations around the world since the shutdown of the World Trade Organization Ministerial in Seattle in 1999.

After Hurricane Katrina, Fithian worked with the Common Ground Collective in New Orleans. Fithian previously served as a National Steering Committee member of United for Peace and Justice, a coalition of over 1,000 local and national groups working to end the war in Iraq and build a broad movement for social change.

She was also a member of the national team of Extinction Rebellion.

Writings
Fithian has written throughout the years, including the introduction to the post-9/11 edition of Abbie Hoffman's Steal this Book, and the 2007 book anthology What Lies Beneath: Katrina, Race, and the State of the Nation by South End Press. Her most recent book is Shut It Down: Stories from a Fierce, Loving Resistance, Chelsea Green, 2019.

Notes

References

External links
 United For Peace and Justice
 

Year of birth missing (living people)
Living people
Skidmore College alumni
American activists